Kavar Rural District is a rural district (dehestan) in the Central District of Kavar County, Fars Province, Iran. At the 2006 census, its population was 23,118, in 4,982 families.  The rural district has 19 villages.

References 

Rural Districts of Fars Province
Kavar County